Regierungsbezirk Allenstein was a Regierungsbezirk, or government region, of the Prussian province of East Prussia from 1905 until 1945. The regional capital was Allenstein (present-day Olsztyn). The territory today is part of the Polish Warmian-Masurian Voivodeship.

History
The government region was created on 1 November 1905 as the third East Prussian Regierungsbezirk out of the southern districts of the two original administrative regions Gumbinnen and Königsberg, which had been established in 1815. It comprised the south of the former Duchy of Prussia; the lands of the Allenstein and Rößel districts had belonged to the Prince-Bishopric of Warmia, annexed by Prussia in 1772.

In 1945 following World War II, Regierungsbezirk Allenstein was dissolved when East Prussia was partitioned between the Republic of Poland and the Soviet Union (Kaliningrad Oblast) according to the resolutions at the Potsdam Conference.

Demographics 
The Allenstein region was ethnically mixed in 1910, with German, Polish and Masurian speakers.

Districts

As of 31 December 1937:

Notes

1905 establishments in Germany
States and territories disestablished in 1945
East Prussia
Government regions of Prussia
History of Warmian-Masurian Voivodeship
Olsztyn